The Dulgalakh (Dulğalaax) is a river in Yakutia, the left, western source river of the Yana.

Course
The Dulgalakh rises on the central Verkhoyansk Range, south of the southern slopes of the Arkachan Plateau. It flows through Kobyaysky and Verkhoyansky districts. Above Verkhoyansk it merges with the Sartang forming the Yana.

See also
List of rivers of Russia
Yana Plateau
Yana-Oymyakon Highlands§Hydrography

References

Rivers of the Sakha Republic
Verkhoyansk Range